Jean Chrysostome Randimbisoa (born November 17, 1954 in Ambalavao) is a Malagasy politician.  He is a member of the Senate of Madagascar for Amoron'i Mania, and is a member of the Tiako I Madagasikara party.

References

1954 births
Living people
Members of the Senate (Madagascar)
Tiako I Madagasikara politicians